Kenwood, California is an unincorporated community and census-designated place (CDP) in Sonoma County, California, located on Sonoma Highway (State Route 12) between the cities of Santa Rosa and Sonoma. It lies east of Sonoma Creek in the upper part of Sonoma Valley, a region sometimes called the Valley of the Moon. Bennett Mountain lies west of the town, and Sugarloaf Ridge to the northeast. The population was 1,028 at the 2010 census.

Kenwood is considered part of the Wine Country. Viticulturally, it lies in the Sonoma Valley AVA. The Kenwood area is known for vineyards and wineries, restaurants, and a European-style resort. An area landmark is the Kunde Estate Winery on Sonoma Highway, which was first planted in 1879.

History
Kenwood is located on the Rancho Los Guilicos Mexican land grant. In 1887, the Sonoma Land & Improvement Company, which owned the property on which the town now sits, laid out lots in anticipation of the railroad which would arrive the following year. The infant community tried on many names: Rohrerville, for one of the owners of the land company; Los Guilicos, and then South Los Guilicos, for the Mexican land grant.

South Los Guilicos Depot on the Santa Rosa and Carquinez Railroad opened in 1887. The First Congregational Church of Los Guilicos was built in 1888. It was relocated from the corner of Los Guilicos and Laurel to its present site in 1893. The parsonage was used for the Kenwood School until construction was completed in 1960. The original name of the church was changed first to Los Guilicos Congregational Church and then to its current name Kenwood Community Church. In 1981, the church was designated Historic Landmark 82 by the County of Sonoma.

A number of townspeople were unhappy, complaining the "Guilicos" was hard to pronounce. Around 1895 a vote was taken to change the name again. One story says that Kenwood won because many of the settlers had come from Kenwood, Illinois. Another traces the choice to the fact that many landowners in the area were from old English families and so were familiar with London's Kenwood House. It is possible that both stories are true, and the name's permanence stemmed from its acceptability to different groups.

Some notable people had ranches in the area including mining, railroad, newspaper and banking magnate, Thomas Kearns, who was also a U.S. Senator from Utah. It is reported that he entertained President Theodore Roosevelt there at the Kearns Ranch, also known as the William Hood House.

The World Pillow Fight Championships originated in Kenwood in the 1970s. Two local community groups held charitable functions to help raise funds that would make improvements to the town. One of these charitable functions was the World Pillow Fighting Championships. A steel pole was made to span the Los Guilicos Spring Creek, which was then filled with mud and the Pillow Fights became an annual event. The last World Pillow Fight Championships in Kenwood were held in Plaza Park in 2006, and subsequent events have been held around the United States. A return to Sonoma County is planned for 2019.

Ray Flugger founded Flowmaster, Inc. in 1983 while working out of a small barn in Kenwood.

Demographics

The 2010 United States Census reported that Kenwood had a population of 1,028. The racial makeup of Kenwood was 930 (90.5%) White, 1 (0.1%) African American, 1 (0.1%) Native American, 23 (2.2%) Asian, 2 (0.2%) Pacific Islander, 45 (4.4%) from other races, and 26 (2.5%) from two or more races. Hispanic or Latino of any race were 79 persons (7.7%).

The Census reported that 98.0% of the population lived in households and 2.0% lived in non-institutionalized group quarters.

There were 467 households, out of which 90 (19.3%) had children under the age of 18 living in them, 234 (50.1%) were opposite-sex married couples living together, 31 (6.6%) had a female householder with no husband present, 21 (4.5%) had a male householder with no wife present. There were 28 (6.0%) unmarried opposite-sex partnerships, and 12 (2.6%) same-sex married couples or partnerships. 140 households (30.0%) were made up of individuals, and 66 (14.1%) had someone living alone who was 65 years of age or older. The average household size was 2.16. There were 286 families (61.2% of all households); the average family size was 2.65.

The population was spread out, with 148 people (14.4%) under the age of 18, 54 people (5.3%) aged 18 to 24, 153 people (14.9%) aged 25 to 44, 432 people (42.0%) aged 45 to 64, and 241 people (23.4%) who were 65 years of age or older. The median age was 53.7 years. For every 100 females, there were 94.0 males. For every 100 females age 18 and over, there were 92.1 males.

The homeowner vacancy rate was 0.6%; the rental vacancy rate was 2.3%. 71.7% of the population lived in owner-occupied housing units and 26.3% lived in rental housing units.

Parks
Kenwood Plaza Park, located two blocks south of State Route 12 at 200 Warm Springs Road and Shaw Park, which is located at 100 Shaw Ave also off State Route 12. Both are managed by the Sonoma County Regional Parks Department.

Annadel State Park lies to the west, Hood Mountain Regional Park lies to the north, and Sugarloaf Ridge State Park lies to the northeast. Further to the south lies Jack London State Historic Park.

Utilities
Western California Telephone Company provided telephone service to Kenwood, Los Gatos, Morgan Hill and Novato. In the 1970s it was acquired by General Telephone, (later GTE and then Verizon). These four areas are now all served by Verizon. Part of Oakmont, a large residential development within the city limits of Santa Rosa, is actually inside the Verizon service area, causing that portion to have Kenwood prefixes. The area code for Kenwood is 707.

Geography
According to the United States Census Bureau, the CDP covers an area of 5.2 square miles (13.4 km2), all of it land.

Climate
Under the Köppen Climate Classification climate classification, "dry-summer subtropical" climates are often referred to as "Mediterranean". This climate zone has an average temperature above 10 °C (50 °F) in their warmest months, and an average in the coldest between 18 and -3 °C (64 to 27 °F). Summers tend to be dry with less than one-third that of the wettest winter month, and with less than 30mm (1.18 in) of precipitation in a summer month.

Wineries

Deerfield Ranch Winery
Kenwood Vineyards
Kunde Family
Chateau St Jean Winery
Mayo Reserve Room
Ledson Winery & Vineyards
Paradise Ridge Winery
Ty Caton Vineyards

Landmark Vineyards
Blackstone Winery
B Wise Vineyards
Family Wineries Kenwood
Kenwood Vineyards
NakedWines.com Wine Studio and Tasting Lounge
Muscardini Cellars

Notable people 

 Valerie K. Brown, former member of the California State Assembly and Sonoma County Board of Supervisors
 Dan Dion, photographer and comedy producer
 Paul Otellini, businessman

See also
 North Bay (San Francisco Bay Area)

References

External links

 Kenwood Wine Trail. 
 Kenwood Fire Protection District home page.
 Kenwood Community Club, a.k.a. Kenwood Depot home page.
 Kenwood Elementary School District home page.

Census-designated places in Sonoma County, California
Sonoma Valley
California wine
Unincorporated communities in Sonoma County, California
Census-designated places in California
Unincorporated communities in California